Biały Ług may refer to the following places:
Biały Ług, Łódź Voivodeship (central Poland)
Biały Ług, Podlaskie Voivodeship (north-east Poland)
Biały Ług, Świętokrzyskie Voivodeship (south-central Poland)
Biały Ług, Piaseczno County in Masovian Voivodeship (east-central Poland)
Biały Ług, Zwoleń County in Masovian Voivodeship (east-central Poland)